Lady Spender, (1901 – 25 March 1970) Australian writer, was born Jean Maud Henderson at Burwood, New South Wales in 1901. As J. M. Spender she wrote crime fiction.

On 6 April 1925 she married the then barrister Percy Spender at Coraki in Northern New South Wales. Percy Spender later became a politician and diplomat and was made KCVO, KBE, QC. The couple had two sons. One son, John Spender, was also a politician and diplomat. The other, Peter Spender, wrote and produced several documentary films.

Jean Spender wrote racy and successful crime thrillers, most of which are set in Sydney with a lightly disguised Percy Spender as the hero.

Spender was an aunt of Dale Spender, feminist scholar, teacher and writer, and the grandmother of Allegra Spender, elected as the Member of Parliament for Wentworth in 2022.

Jean Spender died on 25 March 1970 in Sydney.

Bibliography 

 The Charge Is Murder!, Sydney: Dymocks, 1933 (novel)
 Death Comes in the Night, London: Eyre and Spottiswoode, 1938 (novel)
 Full Moon for Murder, London: Evans Brothers, 1948 (novel)
 Seven Days for Hanging, London: Robert Hale, 1958  (novel)
 Murder on the Prowl, London: Robert Hale, 1960  (novel)
 Death Renders Account, London: Robert Hale, 1960 (novel)
 Ambassador's Wife, Sydney: Angus and Robertson, 1968 (autobiography)

References

External links 
 Papers of Sir Percy Spender (including those of Jean Spender.) Accessed 10 February 2015.
 Photograph of Jean and Percy Spender at State Library of New South Wales. Accessed 10 February 2015.

1901 births
1970 deaths
Australian autobiographers
Australian crime writers
20th-century Australian novelists
20th-century Australian women writers
Women crime writers